William Henry Chaffers (August 2, 1827 – July 1894) was a Quebec businessman and politician. He was a Liberal member of the Senate of Canada for Rougemont division from 1867 to 1894.

He was born Guillaume-Henri-Jacques Chaffers at Quebec City in 1827 and studied at the college at Chambly and the Petit Séminaire de Montréal. He set up in business at Saint-Césaire. Chaffers was lieutenant-colonel in the local militia. He also served as mayor of Saint-Césaire and warden for Rouville County. He was elected to the Legislative Assembly of the Province of Canada for Rouville in an 1856 by-election. Cahffers was elected to the Legislative Council of the Province of Canada in 1864 and named to the Senate after Confederation.

He died at Saint-Hyacinthe in 1894. 

He was the grandson of François Blanchet.

External links
 
 

1827 births
1894 deaths
Politicians from Quebec City
Members of the Legislative Assembly of the Province of Canada from Canada East
Members of the Legislative Council of the Province of Canada
Canadian senators from Quebec
Liberal Party of Canada senators
Mayors of places in Quebec